Phyllopezus is a genus of South American geckos, lizards in the family Phyllodactylidae. The genus contains eight described species.

Habitat
Phyllopezus species occur in a variety of open and forested habitats across South America including Caatinga, Cerrado, Chaco, seasonally dry tropical forest, and Atlantic Forest.

Species and geographic ranges
The following species are recognized as being valid.

Phyllopezus diamantino 
Phyllopezus heuteri  – Heuter's gecko – Paraguay 
Phyllopezus lutzae  – Lutz's gecko, Bogert's gecko, Lutz' marked gecko – Brazil
Phyllopezus maranjonensis  – Peru
Phyllopezus periosus  – Paraíba gecko, Peraiba gecko – Brazil
Phyllopezus pollicaris  – Brazilian gecko – Argentina, Bolivia, Brazil
Phyllopezus przewalskii  – Przewalsky's gecko – Argentina, Bolivia, Brazil, Paraguay
Phyllopezus selmae 

Nota bene: An binomial authority in parentheses indicates that the species was originally described in a genus other than Phyllopezus.

References

Further reading
Peters W (1877). "Bemerkungen über neue oder weniger bekannte Amphibien ". Monatsberichte der Königlich Preussischen Akademie der Wissenschaften zur Berlin 1877: 415-423. (Phyllopezus, new genus, p. 415). (in German).

 
Lizard genera
Taxa named by Wilhelm Peters